are a 6-member Japanese ska band formed in 2002. They broke up in 2011, and played their final show on Halloween of that year. Vocalist Wakana is currently working on a solo project, ペパーミント (Peppermint).

Members 
 Wakana, vocals.
 Maya, vocals.
 Shinya, drums.
 Hiroki, trumpet.
 Haru, trumpet.
 Aya, saxophone.
Joe, guitar.
 Yu-ichi, guitar – former member.

Discography

Singles

Vega/Crybaby （2006-07-05） - opening theme to the Japanese television drama Princess Princess D.
Vega
Crybaby
sundog
Vega (inst.)
Crybaby (inst.)
Boys & Girls （2006-10-18）
Boys ＆ Girls
Good Time Girl
Boys ＆ Girls (inst.)
Hit it! Halloween. (2007-10-31)
Stereo Magic Night
Ghostly Dance Night
 （2007-11-28） - opening theme to the Japanese television drama Biyo Shonen Celebrity

Jewel
(inst.)
Jewel (inst.)
I LOVE! I HATE! (2010-04-14)
I LOVE！I HATE！

Albums 
Time Limit （2005-10-26）
Time Limit
Workaholic
Foot Step
Heartbraker
Right
Juicy-go-round
（2006-11-15）
Boys & Girls
Get back
Daybreak
Rashtail 

Vega 
Peace 
Under Control
Americano 
Peppermint Sugar
Crybaby 

Slash  （2007-04-25）

Rainbow Road
ShangHigh-SKA
Rumble Fish
Have You Never Been Mellow
Us and U (2009-10-7)
PROLOGUE

Que・Sera・Sera
Hello My Planet

Best of Pumpkin ～5th Anniversary～ (2010-7-21)
Stereo Magic Night
TimeLimit

Americano
VEGA

Rashtail
Ghostly Dance Night

GETBACK
sundog

Jewel
RUMBLE FISH
CRYBABY
JUICY-GO-ROUND
PEPPERMINTSUGAR
BOYS&GIRLS
Loveratory  (2010-7-21)
Ｓ.Ｓ.Ｃ
I LOVE！ I HATE！
MILK CROWN

SiXTEEN FAN CLUB
Doping Holiday
BLACK HIPSTER

swagger
「I can't」
Ａ.Ｍ.Ｌ

Concert tours 
M&M Tour
Time Limit 47min. Tour 2005-2006
 Tour 2006-2007 （2006-12-19～2007-02-14）
Slash Tour 2007

External links
 midnightPumpkin's Official Website
  Xtra Large Records midnightPumpkin website
 An interview of the band with Oricon

Japanese ska groups
Musical groups established in 2002
2002 establishments in Japan
Musical groups from Aichi Prefecture